is a Japanese softball left-handed pitcher for the Japan women's national softball team. She represented Japan at the 2020 Summer Olympics and won a gold medal.

Playing career
She participated at the 2019 WBSC U-19 Women's Softball World Cup, winning a silver medal.

She plays for Toyota Red Terriers.

Notes

External links 
 

2001 births
Living people
Japanese softball players
Medalists at the 2020 Summer Olympics
Olympic softball players of Japan
Olympic gold medalists for Japan
Olympic medalists in softball
Softball players at the 2020 Summer Olympics
Competitors at the 2022 World Games
World Games silver medalists
World Games medalists in softball
21st-century Japanese women